Basement Comics is an independent comic book publisher owned by Budd Root. Basement Comics is best known for publishing the popular good-girl title Cavewoman (and all its associated specials, annuals, and one-shots). A division of Amryl Entertainment, Basement Comics is based in Mount Airy, North Carolina, and was founded in 1993.

In addition to Root, other creators affiliated with Basement Comics include Frank Cho, Devon Massey, Chad Spilker, James Robert Smith, Loston Wallace, and Dave Columbo.

Titles 
 Cavewoman titles
 Cavewoman (1993)
 Cavewoman: Meets Explorers (1997)
 Cavewoman: Missing Link (1997)
 Jungle Tales of Cavewoman (1998)
 Cavewoman: Pangean Sea Prelude (1999)
 Cavewoman: Pangean Sea (2000)
 Cavewoman One-Shot Special (2000)
 Cavewoman: Intervention (2001)
 Cavewoman: Meriem's Gallery (2001)
 Klyde & Meriem (2001)
 Cavewoman: Prehistoric Pinups (2001)
 Cavewoman: Raptor (2002)
 Cavewoman: He Said, She Said (2003)
 Cavewoman: The Movie (2003)
 Cavewoman: Reloaded (2005)

 Other titles
 Tigress (1998)
 Basement/Amryl Jam Book (2002)
 Savage Planet (2002)
 Budd's Beauties & Beasts (2005)
 Island of the Tiki Goddess (2007)

References 

Carter, R.J. "Interview: Budd Root: Rooting Around the Basement with Cavewoman", The Trades (Jan. 1, 2002).

External links
 

Comic book publishing companies of the United States
Companies based in North Carolina
Publishing companies established in 1993